Sylvia Gathoni Wahome (born 5 July 1998), better known online as QueenArrow, is a Kenyan esports player and content creator. She began her competitive career in 2017 and specialises in fighting games, primarily in the Tekken series. In 2018, she became the first woman in East Africa to be signed by a professional esports team when she joined American organisation XiT Woundz (now known as XiT Gaming).

Early life
Gathoni began playing video games at the age of three, having been influenced by her older brother and cousin. She enjoyed playing games such as Super Mario, Contra and Tapper, but later gravitated towards fighting games, in particular Mortal Kombat and Street Fighter. She was introduced to Tekken after her father bought her a PlayStation 2 console.

Career
In 2017, Gathoni began her competitive career with the Mortal Kombat XL tournament at the inaugural edition of the East African Gaming Convention, finishing in fourth place. In January 2018, Gathoni began competing in a local Tekken league known as the Tekken 254 Circuit (now known as the Savanna Circuit), ranking nineteenth and seventeenth overall in Seasons One and Two, respectively.

In May 2018, Gathoni was signed by XiT Woundz (now known as XiT Gaming), an esports organisation based in New Jersey, becoming the first Kenyan and the first woman in East Africa to be signed by a professional esports team.

In October 2019, Gathoni earned her first major tournament win at the Nyeri leg of the Safaricom Blaze Esports Tour. In January 2020, Gathoni left XiT Woundz to join British team Brutal Democracy. She announced her departure from the team in August the same year.

In February 2021, American esports team UYU announced the signing of Gathoni as part of their content team. In October 2021, Gathoni graduated with a Bachelor of Laws degree from the Catholic University of Eastern Africa.

In June 2022, Gathoni was named in the Forbes Africa 30 Under 30 class of 2022. On 17 October 2022, Gathoni was unveiled as a sponsored Red Bull athlete, becoming the first Kenyan athlete of any discipline to do so.

Tournament record

Tekken 254 Circuit / Savanna Circuit

Other

References

External links

 
 

1998 births
Living people
Kikuyu people
Kenyan esports players
Women esports players
Fighting game players
Tekken players